There are 50 constituencies in Solomon Islands, each electing one Member of Parliament (MP) to the National Parliament. Elections are held every four years; the most recent took place on 19 November 2014.

Constituencies and MPs as of 2006
The following is the list of constituencies such as it was at the time of the 2006 general election, and the MP elected in each constituency.

References

Politics of the Solomon Islands
 
National Parliament of the Solomon Islands
Solomon Islands
Constituencies